Akbarpur is a community development block in the Nawada district of Bihar, India. The community block is headquartered in the village of the same name, which lies on the banks of the Khuri River. As of the 2011 Census, it was the most populated block in Nawada district.

See also 

 List of things named after Akbar the Great

References

Community development blocks in Nawada district